Robert "Bo" Lyons (born December 15, 1935) is a former American football player and coach.  He was the head coach of Northeastern University's football team from 1972 to 1980. He compiled a 34–52–1 overall record.

Head coaching record

References

1935 births
Living people
American football linebackers
Northeastern Huskies football coaches
Northeastern Huskies football players